Helmut Heinrich Karl Sievert (12 May 1914 – 28 March 1945) was a German footballer who played as a defender or midfielder and made one appearance for the Germany national team.

Career
Sievert earned his first and only cap for Germany on 27 September 1936 in a friendly match against Luxembourg. The home match, which took place in Krefeld, finished as a 7–2 win.

Personal life
A sergeant in the German army, Sievert died in World War II on 28 March 1945 in Benešov, Protectorate of Bohemia and Moravia at the age of 30.

Career statistics

International

References

External links
 
 
 
 
 

1914 births
1945 deaths
People from Hanover Region
Footballers from Lower Saxony
German footballers
Germany international footballers
Association football defenders
Association football midfielders
Hannover 96 players
Eintracht Braunschweig players
German Army soldiers of World War II
German Army personnel killed in World War II
Military personnel from Lower Saxony